Lion of the Desert is a 1980 epic historical war film about the Second Italo-Senussi War, starring Anthony Quinn as Libyan tribal leader Omar Mukhtar, a Bedouin leader fighting the Regio Esercito (Royal Italian Army), and Oliver Reed as Italian General Rodolfo Graziani, who defeated Mukhtar. It was directed by Moustapha Akkad and funded by the government under Colonel Muammar Gaddafi.

Released in May 1981, the film has received positive reviews from critics, but performed poorly at the box office, gaining revenues of US$1.5 million worldwide despite having a $35 million budget. The film was banned in Italy in 1982 and was only shown on pay TV in 2009.

Plot 
In 1929, Italian fascist dictator Benito Mussolini (Rod Steiger) is still faced with the 10-year-long war waged by patriots in the Italian colony of Libya to combat Italian colonization and the establishment of "The Fourth Shore"—the rebirth of a Roman Empire in Africa. Mussolini appoints General Rodolfo Graziani (Oliver Reed) as his sixth governor of Libya, confident that the eminently accredited soldier and fascist Grande can crush the rebellion and restore the dissipated glories of Imperial Rome. Omar al-Mukhtar (Anthony Quinn) leads the resistance to the fascists. A teacher by profession, guerrilla by obligation, Mukhtar had committed himself to a war that cannot be won in his own lifetime. Graziani controls Libya with the might of the Regio Esercito (Royal Italian Army). Tanks and aircraft are used in the desert for the first time. The Italians also committed atrocities - killing of prisoners of war, destruction of crops, and imprisoning populations in concentration camps behind barbed wire.

The film starts by introducing the audience to the historical context of the film. This introductory scene is part of historic records that present the rise of fascism in Italy and how it impacted Libya tragically. The scene concludes by telling that the characters and the events in this film are real and based on historical facts. The first scene after the introduction starts with Mussolini in Italy, who created the Fascist Party in Italy, complaining about his generals’ defeats in Libya. To crush the Libyan resistance after 20 years of failure, and after losing five of the best Italian generals, Mussolini sends his most skillful general, Graziani, to Libya. This scene is then contrasted with a scene of Omar Al-Mokhtar, the old teacher who turned into a fighting rebel during the Italian colonization, teaching his young students in Libya. Graziani goes to Libya and starts his campaign to crush the rebellion. The Libyans show great tenacity and make enormous sacrifices to defend their country.

Despite their bravery, the Libyan Arabs and Berbers suffered heavy losses, because their relatively primitive weaponry was no match for mechanised warfare; despite all this, they continued to fight and managed to keep the Italians from achieving complete victory for 20 years. Graziani was only able to achieve victory through deceit, deception, violation of the laws of war and human rights, and by the use of tanks and aircraft.

Omar Al-Mokhtar shows great perseverance and wisdom in leading the resistance movement. He enters into negotiations with the Italians to liberate Libya, but never reaches a deal with them because they pretend to negotiate only to win time. They ask him for significant concessions and promise him some materialistic rewards to end the resistance movement, but Al-Mukhtar never accepts any of that, even after they captured him. They hang him in public to show the Libyans that resisting them is useless, but the resistance does not stop with his death.

Despite the Libyans' lack of modern weaponry, Graziani recognized the skill of his adversary in waging guerrilla warfare. In one scene, Mukhtar refuses to kill a defenseless young officer, instead giving him the Italian flag to bring home to Italy. Mukhtar says that Islam forbids him to kill captured soldiers and demands that he only fight for his homeland, and that Muslims are taught to hate war itself.

In the end, Mukhtar is captured and tried as a rebel. His lawyer, Captain Lontano, states that since Mukhtar had never accepted Italian rule, he cannot be tried as a rebel and instead must be treated as a prisoner of war (which would save him from being hanged). The judge rejects this, and the film ends with Mukthar being publicly executed by hanging.

Cast 
 Anthony Quinn as Omar al-Mukhtar
 Oliver Reed as General Rodolfo Graziani
 Irene Papas as Mabrouka
 Raf Vallone as Diodiece
 Rod Steiger as Mussolini
 John Gielgud as El Gariani
 Andrew Keir as Salem
 Gastone Moschin as Tomelli
 Stefano Patrizi as Sandrini
 Adolfo Lastretti as Sarsani
 Sky du Mont as Prince Amedeo, Duke of Aosta
 Takis Emmanuel as Bu-Matari
 Rodolfo Bigotti as Ismail
 Robert Brown as Al Fadeel
 Eleonora Stathopoulou as Ali's Mother
 Luciano Bartoli as Captain Lontano
 Claudio Goro as Court President
 Giordano Falzoni as Judge at Camp
 Franco Fantasia as Graziani's Aide
 Ihab Werfaly as Ali

Music

The musical score of Lion of the Desert was composed and conducted by Maurice Jarre, and performed by the London Symphony Orchestra.
The songs "Giovinezza", "Marcia Reale", and "O sole mio" are played, but are not credited.

Soundtrack

Track listing for the first release on LP

Side one (19:12)
 Omar the Teacher 
 Italian Invasion 
 Resistance 
 The Lion of the Desert

Side two (19:33)
 The Displacement
 The Concentration Camp
 The Death
 March of Freedom

Track listing for the first release on CD

 Omar the Teacher (04:26)
 Prelude: Libya 1929 (02:24)
 The Execution of Hamid (05:04)
 Desert Ambush (01:46)
 Omar Enters Camp (04:15)
 The Empty Saddle 
 March to Demination (05:19)
 Ismail's Sacrifice (02:36)
 I Must Go (02:27)
 Graziani's Triumph (01:41)
 Entr'acte (02:19)
 Concentration Camp (03:15)
 Italian Invasion (01:32)
 Starvation (00:53)
 The Hanging (01:27)
 General Graziani (03:00)
 Charge (01:23)
 Phoney Triumph (04:38)
 Omar's Wife (03:22)
 Omar Taken (02:38)
 The Death of Omar (01:38)
 March of Freedom (With Choir) (03:59)

Censorship in Italy 
The Italian authorities banned the film in 1982 because, in the words of Prime Minister Giulio Andreotti, it was "damaging to the honor of the army". The last act of the government's intervention against the film was on April 7, 1987, in Trento; afterward, MPs from Democrazia Proletaria asked Parliament to show the movie at the Chamber of Deputies.

The movie was finally broadcast on television in Italy by Sky Italy on June 11, 2009, during the official visit to Italy of Libya's then leader Muammar Gaddafi, whose government funded the movie.

In 2015, the book Staging Memory by Stefania Del Monte dedicates a whole section to the movie.

Reception 
Cinema historian Stuart Galbraith IV writes about the movie: "A fascinating look inside a facet of Arab culture profoundly significant yet virtually unknown outside North Africa and the Arab world. Lion of the Desert is a Spartacus-style, David vs. Goliath tale that deserves more respect than it has to date. It's not a great film, but by the end, it becomes a compelling one."

The verdict of British historian Alex von Tunzelmann about the movie is: "Omar Mukhtar has been adopted as a figurehead by many Libyan political movements, including both Gaddafi himself and the rebels currently fighting him. Lion of the Desert is half an hour too long and hammy in places, but its depiction of Italian colonialism and Libyan resistance is broadly accurate."

Film critic Vincent Canby writes: "Spectacular… virtually an unending series of big battle scenes."

Clint Morris describes the movie as: "A grand epic adventure that'll stand as a highpoint in the producing career of Moustapha Akkad."

See also 
 The Battle of Algiers, a similar movie about Algerian resistance against French occupation
 Libyan resistance movement
 Italian Libya
 List of Islamic films
 The Message

References

External links 
 
 

1980 films
1980 drama films
1980s biographical films
1980s historical films
1980s war films
English-language Libyan films
War epic films
War films based on actual events
American films based on actual events
Films about Benito Mussolini
Films directed by Moustapha Akkad
Films set in Libya
Films set in Italy
Films set in 1929
Films set in 1931
Films shot in Libya
Films scored by Maurice Jarre
Films about Islam
Guerrilla warfare in film
Film controversies in Italy
1980s English-language films